The Pilot and Transcript was a daily Whig newspaper published in Baltimore, MD from April 2, 1840 to January 25, 1841. The paper was briefly titled "The Pilot" before being renamed "The Pilot and Transcript".

Duff Green established The Pilot and Transcript to support the Harrison-Tyler presidential ticket. While the paper was initially successful in supporting the campaign, Green soon got caught up in a religious controversy about the influence of the Catholic Church in politics. Maryland Whigs grew uncomfortable with the controversy and withdrew their support of the Pilot leading to the paper's end in 1841.

References

External links 
 Newspaper page at Library of Congress Chronicling America

1840 establishments in Maryland
Publications established in 1840
Publications disestablished in 1841
Whig newspapers (United States)